Anjireh (also Romanized as Anjīreh; also known as Anjireh Khafrak and Anjīreh-ye Khafrak) is a village in Rahmat Rural District, Seyyedan District, Marvdasht County, Fars Province, Iran. At the 2006 census, its population was 1,058, in 244 families.

References 

Populated places in Marvdasht County